The Islamic University in Niger (IUIN) is an international university in Say, Niger west of Niamey. Students and faculty study in Arabic, French, and English.

The university's vice-chancellor's office is in Niamey.

History
IUIN began following recommendations at the 2nd Islamic Summit of Kings and Heads of States and governments in 1974 at Lahore (Pakistan).

It was meant to become one of the leading research and educational establishments responding to the needs of the Muslim Ummah in West Africa and the Muslim Word in general, by producing and promoting a new generation of Muslims, technically and morally equipped to face the challenges of the Word.

It started its activities in 1986 with a hundred or so students majoring in Arabic Language and Islamic studies. The IUIN is a member of the Federation of the Universities of the Islamic World (FUIW).

Structure

Degree programmes are offered in five faculties, two centers, and two institutes.

Faculty

 Faculty of Sharia and law
 Faculty of Arabic Language and Human Science
 Faculty of Science and Technology
 Faculty of Economics and Management 
 Faculty of Agronomy

Institutes

 Higher Education Institute for Teachers’ Training and Pedagogy
 The Institute IQRA for Vocational and Technical Center at Lesser Level

Publications

The university publishes the Annals of the Islamic University of Niger.

See also
 Islamic University in Uganda
 Organisation of Islamic Cooperation

References

 .
 SESRIC Directory of Universities in OIC Member Countries.
 Islamic University in Niger. Website of the Organisation of Islamic Cooperation.
 Islamic University of Niger. Directory of African Higher Education Institutions, Michigan State University.
 Islamic University of Niger. Federation of the universities of the Islamic world (2004)
 Javaid Rehman. Islamic State Practices, International Law and the Threat from Terrorism: A Critique of the 'clash of Civilizations' in the New World Order. Hart Publishing, 2005  p. 32
  Resolution No. 1/15-C On The Islamic University In Niger. The Fifteenth -Islamic Conference of Foreign Ministers held in Sanaa, Yemen Arab Republic, from 25 to 29 Rabi Al-Awal, 1405H (18-22 December 1984).

Niger
IUC
IUC
IUC
IUC
1986 establishments in Niger